Doctors Lake is a body of water located off the St. Johns River in Clay County, Florida.  Despite its name, it is not a true lake, as it is actually an inlet, openly connected to the St. Johns.  Because of the estuarine nature of the St. Johns, Doctors Lake is itself somewhat brackish.

Many docks border the lake for recreational activity such as boating, fishing and waterskiing. To the south, the lake splits in half into two small creeks that flow from swampland.

History
Zephaniah Kingsley originally owned much of the land around Doctors Lake, and established the Laurel Grove Plantation there in the early 1800s.  Kingsley captained a ship in the West Indies and was absent from the plantation much of the time.  An overseer was left in charge of his 100 or so slaves, while the plantation's house was looked after by a 13-year-old slave girl, Anta Madjiguene Ndiaye, who Kingsley had purchased in Havana in 1806.  Kingsley later married the girl and had four children.  The community at the north end of the inlet to Doctors Lake is today named "Laurel Grove", while "Kingsley" is a major street in nearby Orange Park.

Geography
Doctors Lake has an area of 13 mi2 (34 km2). It is linked to the St. Johns River by Doctors Inlet. U.S. Route 17 crosses the inlet between Orange Park and rural Clay County. To the north is Orange Park, bordering to the west is Lakeside, and to the east is Jacksonville, Florida.

See also
List of lakes of the St. Johns River
St. Johns River
Jacksonville, Florida

References

External links

Lakes of Florida
Lakes of Clay County, Florida
Geography of Jacksonville, Florida
Tributaries of the St. Johns River
Zephaniah Kingsley